Borujerd ( Borūjerd) is a city and the capital of Borujerd County, Lorestan Province in western Iran. At the 2016 census, its population was 234,997 people. Among the existing modern cities in Iran, Borujerd is one of the oldest reported at least since the 9th century. In Sassanid Empire, Borujerd was a small town and region neighboring Nahavand. Gaining more attention during Great Seljuq Empire in the 9th and 10th centuries, Borujerd stood as an industrial, commercial and strategic city in Zagros Mountains until the 20th century. In its golden ages, Borujerd was selected as the state capital of Lorestan and Khuzestan region during Qajar dynasty in the 18th and 19th centuries. Due to the existence of a large number of production and industrial units and the supply of their products in the domestic and foreign markets, Borujerd is considered the industrial hub of Lorestan province.

Foundation and name
The history of Borujerd before the advent of Islam is not well known. Parthian-era artifacts have been discovered in its environs by non-professional excavators. Moreover, one of Iran's oldest mosques, the Jameh Mosque of Borujerd, was constructed on the remains of a Zoroastrian fire temple. This proves that the region was populated before Islam arrived. The Parthian king Orodes II is credited by some academics with laying the city's foundation. They believe that "Borujerd" stems from the Middle Persian word Wurūgird/Wulūgird/Orodhkard, meaning "built by Orodes." Others consider it to have been built by the Sasanian king Peroz I, arguing that "Piruzgird" was its original name, before being changed into "Burugird", and then later Arabicised into "Burujird".

History
Only from the 9th-century does the name "Borujerd" appear in Islamic chronicles. It first appears in the Kitāb al-buldān of Ibn al-Faqih, and is later reported in various forms, such as "Warukird", "Warugird", "Barugird" and "Barujird".

Esteemed religious institutions operated in Borujerd during the Qajar era, producing two distinguished Shia scholars, Asad Allah Borujerdi (died ) and Hossein Borujerdi (died 1961).

Geography and climate
Borujerd city is located approximately 1670 meters above sea level and has a moderate climate with cold winters. The highest point is Garrin Mountain 3623 m above sea level and the lowest area is Gelerood River in South with 1400 m elevation. Borujerd Township has 2600 km2 area with approximately 400,000 inhabitants distributed in the city of Oshtorinan and more than 180 villages. Owing to favorable topographic and climatic conditions, the plains are devoted to cultivation of grain. Wherever irrigation is possible (by means of qanāts, wells, diversion of water of streams), cotton, melons, grapes, and fruit trees (especially almonds) are grown.

Borujerd is located on Silakhor Plain which is the largest agricultural land of Lorestan. The high-elevated Zagros Mountains surrounds it from South East to North West and the peaks are covered with snow most of the times. Rural people work in farms or keep their domestic animals. Other people work in governmental offices, armed forces, factories or small local businesses. The feet of Zagros Mountains is a great destination for nomads and many Lurs and Bakhtiari nomads move there in summer. The area is paved with highways and is a crossroad between Tehran and Khuzestan Province as well as Isfahan Province and Kermanshah Province.

Population
Borujerd City has 256,962 inhabitants (estimated for 2006) and it is the 31st largest city in Iran and the 2nd largest in Lorestan . Borujerd is the industrial point of Lorestan. Its historical and cultural background as well as its remarkable nature, has changed it to a tourist destination. The city has been named as Dār-Al-Sorur which means the house of happiness. Borujerd's population was estimated about 20000 in mid-1800s. Official statistics by

Language

The people of Borujerd speak mostly the Borujerdi dialect, which is a distinctive dialect on the continuum between Luri and Persian, though to high degree affected by the specific accent common among the Jewish population of Borujerd since their escape from Mesopotamia. Other speech varieties such as Luri, Laki, and the local Judæo-Iranian dialect can be heard as well.

Historical attractions
Jameh Mosque of Borujerd
Soltani Mosque of Borujerd
Imamzadeh Ja'far, Borujerd
Imamzadeh Ghasem, Borujerd
Imamzadeh Ibrahim, Borujerd
Imamzadeh Shahzadeh Abol-Hasan, Borujerd
Imamzadeh Vallian, Borujerd
Imamzadeh Ghasem, Borujerd
Zavvarian Tomb of Borujerd
Ghaleh Hatam Bridge, Borujerd
Chalanchulan Bridge, Borujerd
Ghorogh Hill, Borujerd
Roomian Hill, Borujerd
Bazaar of Borujerd

Parks and natural attractions
Goldasht Valley, Borujerd
Vennaii Village, Borujerd
Chogha Hill of Borujerd
Bishe Dalan Pound, Borujerd
Oshtorankuh, Dorood
Women's Park of Borujerd

Notable people from Borujerd
Seyyed Hossein Borujerdi, religious leader
Abdolhossein Zarrinkoob, writer and historian
Loris Tjeknavorian, musician
Zahra Rahnavard, artist and politician
Mostafa Abdollahi, director and actor
Jafar Shahidi, historian, bibliographer
Mehrdad Avesta, poet 20th-century
Arvin Moazzami, athlete 
Ehsan Mohajer Shojaei, athlete
Mahvash, singer, dancer and stage performer
Ehsan Rouzbahani, athlete 
Ali Abdo, athlete
Saman Salur, film director 
Mohammad Boroujerdi, commander
Reza Beiranvand, athlete
Iraj Rad, actor
Farnaz Esmaeilzadeh, athlete
Mahmoud Saremi, reporter
Abdolmohammad Ayati, author
Mir Shamsuddin Adib-Soltani, philosopher

Gallery

See also

1909 Borujerd earthquake
 2006 Borujerd earthquake
 Borujerdi dialect

References

Sources

External links

Borujerd Information Portal
Encyclopedia of the Orient 

 
Towns and villages in Borujerd County
Cities in Lorestan Province